Pancake is a batter cake fried in a pan or on another hot surface.

Pancake or pancakes may also refer to:

Art, entertainment, and media
 The Pancakes, a music group from Hong Kong
 Pancakes (You're the Worst), the series finale of You're the Worst

People
 Pancake (actress), Thai actress Khemanit Jamikorn
 Pancake (surname)

Places
 Pancake, Texas
 Pancake, West Virginia

Technology
 Pancake engine, a radial internal combustion engine with a vertical crankshaft
 Pancake (slot car), a type of slot car with a vertical shaft and flat commutator
 Pancake lens, a wide-angle or flat lens in photography

Other meanings
 Pan-Cake, Max Factor's makeup products
 Pancake collapse of a building

See also
 Zeldovich pancake, a theoretical condensation of gas following the Big Bang